Slava "Ostap" Osinski is a street artist who creates works on acrylic glass using packing tape or duct tape and duct tape. He also produces work in live performances and also creates installation art works.

Ostap was born and raised in Dnipropetrowsk in Ukraine, where he studied architecture. In 1995 he moved to Germany and he later moved to Berlin. Ostap has been active in Berlin's street art and urban art scene since 2013.

Career 

Ostap was a resident artist at the Urban Spree gallery in Berlin in December 2012. In an interview about his work, Ostap has said:

"5 years ago I found Tape art - the art of gluing sticky tape. I have worked with this media ever since. Very often I mix the Tape Art with other forms of art, for example, Street Art, in which I try to give the impulse to find the new art-forms. Installations with the sticky tape give me the opportunity to present my ideas with the new point of view."

Ostap's work is influenced by modern culture and pop culture, politics, society, religion and sex. He cites pop art artists such as Andy Warhol as influences, as well as impressionist artists including Vincent van Gogh.

Works 

Ostap says of his art: 
"I distance myself from the classic form of street art, like graffiti or tagging – with my art, I try to arouse an emotion in the audience, especially positive emotions, like smiles or laughs, or on the contrary – to show my personal attitude to the modern culture, politics, society, religion and sex. It does not mean, that in every work there is a great meaning, sometimes, I like to work with abstract forms and minimalist shapes."

Although a street artist, Ostap's works have also been exhibited in various projects and galleries.

Gallery

References

External links 

Tape art blog
Q&A with Ostap
Representing Tape art- Interview with tape artist

German graffiti artists
Living people
Artists from Berlin
German contemporary artists
Pop artists
1978 births